For other people with similar names see William Cowan

Will Cowan (1912 – January 4, 1994) was a director and producer of films. He was born in Scotland.

Filmography

Pony Post (1940), producer
Boss of Bullion City (1940), producer
Man from Montana (1941), producer
Fighting Bill Fargo (1941), producer
Rawhide Rangers (1941), producer
The Masked Rider (1941), producer
Arizona Cyclone (1941), producer
Bury Me Not on the Lone Prairie (1941), producer
Keeping Fit (1942), producer
Boss of Hangtown Mesa (1942), producer
Stagecoach Buckaroo (1942), producer
Get Going (1943), producer
He's My Guy (1943), producer
Gals, Incorporated (1943), producer
Jungle Woman (1944), co-producer
Dead Man's Eyes (1944), co-producer
The Frozen Ghost (1945), producer
Honeymoon Ahead (1945), producer
The Dark Horse, producer
Idea Girl (1946), producer
Girl Time (1947), director
Symphony in Swing (1948), director and producerLenny Hambro (1949), directorTed Fio Rito and His Orchestra (1949), producer and directorThe Pecos Pistol (1949), producer and directorSugar Chile Robinson, Billie Holiday, Count Basie and His Sextet (1950), directorTales of the West: Cactus Caravan / South of Santa Fe (1950)Jimmy Dorsey's Varieties (1952)House Party (1953) with Andy Russell and DellaChamp Butler Sings (1954) short, starring Champ ButlerRoundup of Rhythm (1954) with Bill Haley and the CometsRhythms with Rusty (1956), directorGolden Ladder (1957), directorRiot in Rhythm (1957), directorThe Big Beat (1958), director and producer		The Thing That Couldn't Die'' (1958), director

References

1912 births
1994 deaths
British emigrants to the United States